Park Mee-kyung or Park Mi-kyung (born 13 May 1975 / 6 April 1975) is a retired South Korean female volleyball player. She was part of the South Korea women's national volleyball team.

She competed with the national team at the 2000 Summer Olympics in Sydney, Australia, finishing 8th. On the club level she played with Hanil Synthetic Fiber, then in 1998 transferred to Korea Highway Corporation.

Clubs
 Hanil Synthetic Fiber (1994–1997)
 Korea Highway Corporation (1998)

See also
 South Korea at the 2000 Summer Olympics

References

External links
 
 http://www.gettyimages.com/photos/mee-kyung-park?excludenudity=true&sort=mostpopular&mediatype=photography&phrase=mee%20kyung%20park&family=editorial

1975 births
Living people
South Korean women's volleyball players
Sportspeople from Daegu
Volleyball players at the 2000 Summer Olympics
Olympic volleyball players of South Korea
Asian Games medalists in volleyball
Volleyball players at the 1998 Asian Games
Volleyball players at the 2002 Asian Games
Medalists at the 1998 Asian Games
Medalists at the 2002 Asian Games
Asian Games silver medalists for South Korea